"Rose's Pigeon " was the fifth episode of the third series of the British television series, Upstairs, Downstairs. The episode is set in 1913.

Cast
 George Innes (Alfred Harris) 
 Leon Sinden (Det. Inspector Bowles)
 Bernard Barnsley (Police Sergeant)

Plot
In 1906: Rose catches footman Alfred Harris and German Baron Klaus von Rimmer having sexual relations. The men flee to Germany after Alfred discovers the Baron is to be arrested as a spy, and tips him off.

In the present year 1913: Alfred Harris returns to the house Eaton Place in 1913 seeking refuge after murdering his new employer and (it is implied) lover.  Rose, the head house parlour maid, is shocked when Alfred turns up at Eaton Place one night. He claims he's been sacked by his former employer and is homeless. She agrees to hide him in one of the basement rooms, but is horrified when it later transpires Alfred is actually on the run from the police, having murdered his previous employer. Hudson tells Mr Bellamy, who notifies the police. A dramatic standoff results, with Alfred holding Edward hostage at knifepoint in the coal cellar. Alfred is arrested and subsequently hanged for murder, although Rose protests against the sentence's severity, arguing it was not right to do so to a person "who's not right in the 'ead."

Background
"Rose's Pigeon" was recorded by the best tube cameras: EMI 2001S.

Notes

References

See also 
 A Suitable Marriage

Upstairs, Downstairs (series 3) episodes
1973 British television episodes
Fiction set in 1907